Jason Bloom may refer to:

 Jason Bloom (lacrosse) (born 1982), American lacrosse player
 Jason Bloom (director), American film and television director